Lazarus Island, also known as Pulau Sakijang Pelepah, is one of the Southern Islands in Singapore. It is south of the main island of Singapore, off the Straits of Singapore and is uninhabited.  It is connected by a causeway to Saint John's Island, which is reachable by ferry.

Etymology
Lazarus island was also known as Pulau Sakijang Pelepah (alternatively spelled as Pulau Sekijang Pelepah). Literally translated from Malay, 'sa' means one, 'kijang' means barking deer, and 'pelepah' is a palm frond. Put together, it means 'Island of One Barking Deer and Palms'.

It is unclear when and why it was renamed to Lazarus Island. The nearby St Johns Island was originally a penal colony and a quarantine station initially for cholera, beri-beri then later for leprosy. Lepers may have been transferred to Lazarus Island (the connection being that the biblical character Lazarus was a leper). See Order of Saint Lazarus and Leper colony. Another possibility is that it was renamed after World War II to honour Lazarus Rayman who, as a high-ranking official in the treasury department of the British High Commission, took steps to save the colony's gold reserves from the Japanese. He was variously honoured by Singapore after the War, with a park (now built over) named after him, and possibly a statue, though these are all family stories passed down.

References

Islands of Singapore
Southern Islands